Andy Ennis is an American tenor saxophone player, part of the Baltimore jazz scene. He began performing professionally in 1957, at the Royal Theatre. Ennis was a member of the Ray Charles Band and was briefly the leader.

He is the brother of Ethel Ennis, a well-known local singer and pianist.

References

External links
Baltimore Jazz

American jazz saxophonists
American male saxophonists
Jazz musicians from Maryland
Living people
Musicians from Baltimore
21st-century American saxophonists
21st-century American male musicians
American male jazz musicians
Year of birth missing (living people)